The Temple of Minerva is an ancient Roman building in Assisi, Umbria, central Italy. It currently houses a church, built in 1539 and renovated in Baroque style in the 17th century.

The temple was built in the 1st century BC by will of Gnaeus Caesius and Titus Caesius Priscus, who were two of the city's quattuorviri and also financed the construction. The attribution to the goddess Minerva derives from the finding of  a female statue, although a dedication stone to Hercules has been found, and the temple was likely dedicated to this male demi-god. In the Middle Ages the temple housed a tribunal with an annexed jail, as testified by one of Giotto's frescoes in the St. Francis Basilica, which portrays the church windows with bars.

Of the ancient temple, the façade has been preserved, with six Corinthian columns supporting the architrave and a small pediment. The columns were originally covered by a very strong plaster, which was perhaps colored. The cella was completely demolished during the church's construction, in the 16th century, while a small section of the temple was found in the 20th century near the altar.

The temple was visited and described by the German poet Goethe during his travels in Italy, as the first ancient structure in good condition seen during his life (1786).

See also
 List of Ancient Roman temples

References

External links
Page at Travelitalia website 

Maria Minerva
1st-century BC religious buildings and structures
Temples in Italy
Temples of Minerva